Dress Like Your Idols is the fourth full-length album by indie rock band BOAT, released in 2011.  It is the follow up to the band's 2009 album, Setting the Paces.

Reception

Dress Like Your Idols received largely positive reviews from critics.  AllMusic's Tim Sendra praised the album saying, "Dress Like is their best record to date, with their best songs" and the songs have "super hooks."  Pitchfork Media's Mark Hogan claimed, "The result is the best album yet from a band whose style finally appears to be back in vogue" and compared the album's sound to Surfer Blood and Weezer.

Album cover
The album cover received acclaim, including being named one of the best of the year by Paste Magazine. The cover artwork features illustrated tributes to several other album covers, a wink at the title Dress Like Your Idols. From top to bottom, left to right, the tributes are:
 Built to Spill, Keep It Like a Secret
 Ramones, End of the Century
 The Long Winters, When I Pretend to Fall
 Jon Spencer Blues Explosion, Orange
 The Velvet Underground, The Velvet Underground & Nico
 The Sonics, Boom (or Sonic Youth, Washing Machine on some versions)
 Pearl Jam, Yield
 Elliott Smith, Figure 8
 Pavement, Wowee Zowee

Track listing

 "Changing of the Guard" – 2:48
 "Bite My Lips" – 3:09
 "King Kong" – 3:15
 "L-O-V-E" – 0:47
 "Forever in Armitron" – 3:07
 "Classically Trained" – 2:38
 "Water It Down" – 0:47
 "Kinda Scared of Love Affairs" – 2:38
 "Landlocked" – 3:04
 "Do the Double Take" – 1:50
 "Frank Black Says" – 2:15
 "Noises in the Night" – 2:45
 "Dress Like Your Idols" – 2:25

Personnel

 D. Crane, vocals and guitar
 J. Goodman, multi-instrumentalist, percussion
 J. Long, drums, percussion, vocals
 M. McKenzie, bass, guitar, vocals 
 B. Stewart, guitar, tambourine 
 J. Roderick, additional vocal (9)

Recording

 Jackson Justice Long, producer, recording, mixing (7, 10)
 Cam Nicklaus, mixing, recording
 Ed Brooks, mastering
 D. Crane, recording (10)
 J. Mendoza, additional recording (10)

References 

2011 albums